Frank Russell Barry (called Russell) was an Anglican bishop and author who served as Bishop of Southwell for over 20 years in the middle of the 20th century.<ref>The Times, Monday, 8 December 1941; p. 6; Issue 49103; col D Ecclesiastical News Bishop of Southwell Nominated </ref>

Born on 28 January 1890 he was educated at Bradfield and Oriel College, Oxford and ordained in 1914. During the Great War he had two interviews for a commission as a Temporary Chaplain to the Forces. He was unsuccessful at his first interview in October, 1914, but was appointed in November, 1915. As TCF he was awarded the Distinguished Service Order and Mentioned in Despatches. The citation for his DSO referred to his actions near Mouquet Farm during the Battle of the Somme. 'For conspicuous gallantry and devotion to duty. He tended and dressed the wounded under very heavy fire with the greatest courage and determination. He set a splendid example throughout the operation'. Although only 28 when the War ended, Barry had been promoted from 4th Class to 2nd Class within the Chaplaincy and, in 1919, became Principal of the Ordination Test School at Knutsford. In 4 years, about 700 men would be trained for ordination, and they would serve as clergymen into the 1970s. In 1923, Barry was appointed Archdeacon of Egypt, but soon returned to England to become, successively, Professor of New Testament Interpretation'' at King's College London, Fellow and Tutor of Balliol College, Oxford, Vicar of the University Church of St Mary the Virgin, Oxford, Canon of Westminster Abbey and Rector of St John's, Smith Square before his elevation to the episcopate. He was honoured by the universities of St Andrews and Nottingham and by Lambeth as a Doctor of Divinity. There is a memorial plaque to Barry in Southwell Cathedral.

References

External links

 National Portrait Gallery: Portrait by Walter Stoneman of Russell Barry as Bishop of Southwell, 1946

1890 births
People educated at Bradfield College
Alumni of Oriel College, Oxford
Companions of the Distinguished Service Order
Fellows of Balliol College, Oxford
Academics of King's College London
Fellows of King's College London
Anglican archdeacons in Africa
Bishops of Southwell
20th-century Church of England bishops
Holders of a Lambeth degree
1976 deaths
British Army personnel of World War I
Royal Army Chaplains' Department officers
Honorary Chaplains to the Queen
Canons of Westminster